The 1984 Indian general election in Jammu and Kashmir to the 8th Lok Sabha were held for 6 seats. Indian National Congress won 3 seats and Jammu and Kashmir National Conference won 3 seats.

Constituency Details

Results

Party-wise Results

List of Elected MPs

See also 

 Elections in Jammu and Kashmir
 Results of the 2004 Indian general election by state

References 

Jammu
1984
1984